The 2019 Sun Belt Conference men's soccer season was the 18th season of men's varsity soccer in the conference. The season began in late August 2019 and concluded in mid-November 2019.

Background 
The 2018 regular season began in August 2018 and concluded in November 2018. The regular season champions, Georgia State, also won the 2018 Sun Belt Conference Men's Soccer Tournament and earned the conference's automatic berth into the 2018 NCAA Division I Men's Soccer Tournament. It was Georgia State's first berth into the NCAA tournament since 2011. There, Georgia State were eliminated in the first round in a penalty shoot-out by Charlotte.

Head coaches

Preseason

Preseason poll 
The preseason poll was released on August 13, 2019.

Preseason national polls 
The preseason national polls will be released in July and August 2019.

Regular season

Early season tournaments 

Early season tournaments will be announced in late Spring and Summer 2019.

Results 

All times Eastern time.† denotes Homecoming game

Week 1 (Aug. 25–31)

Week 2 (Sep. 1–7)

Week 3 (Sep. 8–14)

Week 4 (Sep. 15–21)

Week 5 (Sep. 22–28)

Week 6 (Sep. 29–Oct. 5)

Week 7 (Oct. 6–12)

Week 8 (Oct. 13–19)

Week 9 (Oct. 20–26)

Week 10 (Oct. 27–Nov. 2)

Week 11 (Nov. 3–Nov. 9)

Postseason

Sun Belt Tournament

NCAA tournament

Rankings

National rankings

Regional rankings - USC Southeast Region

Awards and honors

Postseason honors

Home Match Attendance

Bold – Exceed capacity
†Season High

2020 MLS Draft

The 2020 MLS SuperDraft was held in January 2020. No SBC players were selected in the draft.

Homegrown players 

The Homegrown Player Rule is a Major League Soccer program that allows MLS teams to sign local players from their own development academies directly to MLS first team rosters. Before the creation of the rule in 2008, every player entering Major League Soccer had to be assigned through one of the existing MLS player allocation processes, such as the MLS SuperDraft.

To place a player on its homegrown player list, making him eligible to sign as a homegrown player, players must have resided in that club's home territory and participated in the club's youth development system for at least one year. Players can play college soccer and still be eligible to sign a homegrown contract. No SBC players signed homegrown contract.

References

External links 
 Sun Belt Conference Men's Soccer

 
2019 NCAA Division I men's soccer season